The Huns ( is a 1960 adventure film directed  by Sergio Grieco and starring Chelo Alonso and Jacques Sernas about Attila the Hun.

Plot

Cast

 Chelo Alonso as Tanya 
 Jacques Sernas as  Malok
 Folco Lulli as   Igor 
 Mario Petri as   Timur
 Philippe Hersent as   Kathierma	
 Piero Lulli as Seikor 
 Andrea Scotti as Chagatai
 Ciquita Coffelli as Oruska
 Pietro Tordi as Morobas 
 Raf Baldassarre as Prisoner

Release
The Huns was released in Italy on 5 October 1960. It was released in the United States on 14 November 1962.

References

Footnotes

Sources

External links

1960 adventure films
Italian adventure films
French adventure films
Peplum films
Films directed by Sergio Grieco
Sword and sandal films
1960s French films
1960s Italian films